Poliosia concolora is a moth in the family Erebidae. It was described by Jeremy Daniel Holloway in 2001. It is found on Borneo and in the north-eastern Himalayas. The habitat consists of lowland forests, including wet heath forests and disturbed coastal forests.

The length of the forewings is 10–11 mm.

References

Moths described in 2001
Lithosiina